Events from the year 1752 in Wales.

Incumbents
Lord Lieutenant of North Wales (Lord Lieutenant of Anglesey, Caernarvonshire, Flintshire, Merionethshire, Montgomeryshire) – George Cholmondeley, 3rd Earl of Cholmondeley 
Lord Lieutenant of Glamorgan – Charles Powlett, 3rd Duke of Bolton
Lord Lieutenant of Brecknockshire and Lord Lieutenant of Monmouthshire – Thomas Morgan
Lord Lieutenant of Cardiganshire – Wilmot Vaughan, 3rd Viscount Lisburne
Lord Lieutenant of Carmarthenshire – vacant until 1755
Lord Lieutenant of Denbighshire – Richard Myddelton
Lord Lieutenant of Pembrokeshire – Sir Arthur Owen, 3rd Baronet
Lord Lieutenant of Radnorshire – William Perry

Bishop of Bangor – Zachary Pearce
Bishop of Llandaff – Edward Cresset
Bishop of St Asaph – Robert Hay Drummond
Bishop of St Davids – The Hon. Richard Trevor (until 7 December)

Events
 April - A quarryman is killed in an attempted raid on a granary at Caernarfon. 
5 June - Frances, mother of Sir Watkin Williams-Wynn, 4th Baronet, purchases the Mathafarn estate on her son's behalf.
9 November - Richard Trevor becomes Bishop of Durham.
unknown dates
 Howell Harris founds the Teulu Trefeca ("The Trefeca family")
 Sir John Glynne, 6th Baronet, builds New Hawarden Castle.
 A turnpike road opens between Wrexham and Shrewsbury.
 The first Methodist chapel in Caernarfonshire is built on land adjoining Tŷ-mawr farm, Bryncroes.

Arts and literature

New books
 John Evans - Some Account of the Welch Charity Schools
 Theophilus Evans - A History of Modern Enthusiasm

Music
John Parry - A Collection of Welsh, English & Scotch Airs
Harri Llwyd - Hymnau ar Amryw Ystyriaethau

Births
 2 January - Nicholas Owen, priest and antiquary (died 1811)
 18 January
 Josiah Boydell, painter (died 1817)
 John Nash, architect (died 1835)
 March - Edward Jones (Bardd y Brenin), harpist (died 1824)
 5 November - Richard Richards, judge (died 1823)
 12 December - Thomas Bulkeley, 7th Viscount Bulkeley, politician (died 1822)
 date unknown
 Richard Llwyd, poet and writer (died 1835)
 Thomas Assheton Smith I, industrialist (died 1828)

Deaths
 23 April - James Bulkeley, 6th Viscount Bulkeley, 35 
 31 May - "Madam" Sidney Griffith, Methodist (born c.1720)
 17 November - Thomas Powell, politician, about 51
probable - Edward Roberts, mayor of Philadelphia, USA (born c.1690)

References

1752 by country
1752 in Great Britain